Alejandro Nuñez, better known as Zutzut, is a Mexican producer based in Monterrey who has released music under the N.A.A.F.I collective. He has been involved in the Mexican electronic music scene as a DJ since 2006. He played at the SXSW festival in 2016, the Sónar festival in 2017, as well as Boiler Room for the ten-year anniversary of N.A.A.F.I. in 2020. He has produced for GAIKA and Dedekind Cut, as well as remixed for Nick León and Omega Sapien. His tracks on a 2015 bootleg N.A.A.F.I release Pirata 2 were compared to the sounds of Bad Bunny's YHLQMDLG (2020) album.

His music has been referred to as not replicating "conventional dancefloor jams", but rather as evoking a more cathartic response in the listener. It has also been conveyed as reflecting his ancestry yet with an unconventional sound that is oriented toward the future. Speaking on his EP Placas in an interview with The Fader, Zutzut commented: "Like all my work I tried to canalize bad energy into something positive, and even if the general vibe of the EP is tension and paranoid you also can find those little moment of beauty to rest — like life".

Discography 
Albums

 El Pack, Vol. 2 (2020)

EPs

 Zutzut (2014)
 Placas (2017)

References 

Mexican electronic musicians
Mexican record producers
Year of birth missing (living people)
Living people